Gareth Michael John Davies (born 4 February 1983) is an English footballer, who plays for Handsworth Parramore

Career
Davies was born in Chesterfield, England. Whilst playing for Chesterfield F.C. he broke his foot in three places in a pre-season friendly in August 2007, which ruled him out for at least six weeks. He joined Stalybridge Celtic on a month's loan in September 2007 to help his return to first-team football. He made five appearances during his spell with the club. He left Chesterfield by mutual consent in January 2008. He joined York City on trial in February, but joined Halifax Town later that month on a deal until the end of the season. He signed for Gainsborough Trinity in the Conference North in July 2008. He moved to Matlock Town for the 2009/10 season but subsequently joined Boston United in January 2010.

Gareth Davies currently played for Matlock Town after rejoining from Boston United. He then stayed at the club until the end of the 2013 season when he went onto sign for Belper Town in the 2013/2014 season. After a successful couple of seasons at Belper, Gareth moved to Handsworth Parramore toward the end of the 2014 season.

References

External links

1983 births
Living people
Footballers from Chesterfield
English footballers
Association football fullbacks
Association football midfielders
Chesterfield F.C. players
Stalybridge Celtic F.C. players
Halifax Town A.F.C. players
Gainsborough Trinity F.C. players
English Football League players
National League (English football) players
Boston United F.C. players
Matlock Town F.C. players
Buxton F.C. players
Handsworth F.C. players